The Cima Ekar Observing Station (obs. code: 098) is an astronomical observatory on the crest of Cima Ekar, a mountain ridge located approximately 4 kilometers southeast of and 350 m higher than the town of Asiago, Italy.

The Station is an annex to the nearby Asiago Astrophysical Observatory, also operated by the University of Padua. Cima Ekar hosts the 1966-built 67/92-cm Schmidt telescope and the 182-cm telescope dedicated to Nicholas Copernicus, the largest telescope in Italy.

Asiago-DLR Asteroid Survey 

Co-located at Cima Ekar is the Asiago-DLR Asteroid Survey (ADAS), IAU code 209. At Cima Ekar, Andrea Boattini, Flavio Castellani, Giuseppe Forti, Vittorio Goretti, Ulisse Munari, and Maura Tombelli have discovered a great number of asteroids.

See also 
 List of astronomical observatories

References

External links 
 The 67/92-cm Schmidt telescope at Cima Ekar Observing Station

University of Padua
Asiago
Buildings and structures in the Province of Padua